Arcana Jayne is a webcomic by Girlamatic editor and former Sequential Tart contributor Lisa R. Jonté. Set in a 1930s-meets-sorcery world, the comic follows the adventures of Jayne MacLir, a Witch, a hedonist, a know-it-all and a "freelance researcher".

Arcana Jayne was one of the first titles on the subscription-based webcomics anthology site Girlamatic.  All of the stories are scripted by Lisa Jonté, but have involved a variety of artists.

The current storyline (2006) is Palladium (featuring the art of Stevie Wilson), and is a story of "Pedigree, progeny and matrilineal machinations; Jayne and Padraigh are about to discover that family breeds contempt".

Completed stories

A'Soulin'
A story of magic, malice, devotion and ghostly tom-foolery, with art begun by Lisa Jonté and finished by Tracy Williams.

Hair of the Dog
A story of sex, betrayal, Lupinism and fashion, with old friends and new enemies. The artwork was begun by Lisa Jonté and was completed by mpMann.

Between the Dark and the Dawn
Just how does a witch spend her holiday? What gifts does she give to those she loves? With art by Spike Trotman.

Tango
A story which presents human relations like a dance, and though we may stumble ungracefully we all must take our turn on the floor. Even if someone has to push us out there in the first place.  With art by Lea Hernandez.

Cast of characters

Major characters
 Jayne Renee MacLir – Born April 1, 1908.  Treasure Seeker, Hedonist.  Occasionally assists her father in locating ancient artifacts for archeological study. Jayne lives in a house amid the branches of a magically grown walnut tree at the top of Mt. Wanda in Martinez, California.
 Padraigh Eamon Flynn – Born January 21, 1913.  Inventor, Mechanical Scientist, natural blonde and Jayne's best friend.  Padraigh lives in an apartment above his place of business (Padraigh E. Flynn Scientific Mechanicals & Practical Inventions) in downtown Martinez, California.  Padraigh is a subscriber to the periodical Modern Technologist's Digest (see Between the Dark and the Dawn).
 Emilio Ridha – Born August 1, 1902. Friend of Jayne and Padraigh, as well as a Ritual Summoner/Entertainer.  Emilio is the leader of Los Cantantes de la Muerte (The Singers of the Dead), a traveling entertainment troupe.  He lives in a pleasant craftsman style house near the center of town in Todos Santos, California.
 Zoharr Osnat Haddad – Witch, thief, mercenary and childhood enemy of Jayne and Padraigh.  Zoharr appears in A'Soulin'.

Minor/Supporting characters
 Elizabeth Anne MacLir – Jayne's mother, who is also a witch, works as an Independent Liaison for the International Union of Magic Workers (Local 4432), acting as a Consultant for the U.S. Bureau of the Supernatural; Confirmation and Control Division.
 Jacques René Breton – Jayne's father is a Doctor of the Arcane and Professor of Historical Philosophies at the Academy La Dama Exaltée where Jayne receives her training in witchcraft.
 Katch'l – A rat of unusual intelligence who lives in Jayne's treehouse.  Little has been revealed of this character, but she is sociable enough to eat breakfast with Jayne and Padraigh and can apparently follow their conversation.  Katch'l seems to have one normal eye and one red eye.
 Aoife Fidelma Flynn – Padraigh's grandmother, and also Professor of Physical and Arcane Defenses at the Academy La Dama Exaltée.
 Dan Adams – The spirit of a lecherous cowboy encountered in A'Soulin'.
 Destineé – A mysterious woman encountered by Emilio and Padraigh in Hair of the Dog who has a history of working with Jayne's mother.
 Etienne – A werewolf Jayne has a dalliance with at the beginning of Hair of the Dog.
 Cesaire – The leader of Etienne's werewolf pack.
 Gaston – An associate of Destineé.
 Babette – A prospective member of Cesaire's pack.
 Elise – A maid who works for Jayne's Great Aunt Alchemae.
 Alchemae – Jayne's snobbish and bullying Great Aunt.
 Cadence – Jayne's cousin and bullied victim of Great Aunt Alchemae.

The people of Jayne's world 
 Humanity – Jayne's world is superficially similar to our own in the 1930s and consequently the dominant species is human.  The main difference between real world humans and the humans in Jayne's world is that most are born with at least some small degree of magical or psychic potential, although most are not consciously aware of this.
 The Neo-Azteca – Descendants of the Aztecs who dwell in Central America.  Little has been revealed of these people so far, except that, according to Zoharr, they do not have "blood rites".
 Pixies – Tiny, magical and usually nude folk who inhabit rural areas (see their appearance in Hair of the Dog where they are encountered at the Muir Memorial Pixie Reserve).
 Werewolves – Werewolves live in social "packs" and do not normally prey on the humans in their vicinity (the behavior of Cesaire's entire pack in Hair of the Dog would be considered an aberration).	Different packs can be differentiated by their hair color, and Cesaire's pack is blondes-only (see Hair of the Dog).
 The Sidhe – Sometimes also known as The Fey, The Sidhe are the Fair Folk of Jayne's World.  They exist on their own plane of existence but are able to manifest in the waking world in a limited fashion.  Both Seelie (benevolent) and Unseelie (malevolent) Sidhe exist.
 Gnomes – Gnomes apparently exist somewhere in Jayne's world as Gnomish (and especially Pig-Gnomish) appears to be a very difficult language to understand (see Hair of the Dog).
 Vampires – Vampires are known to exist although nothing has yet been revealed about them in the comic (as of March 2006).

External links 
Girlamatic (all Arcana Jayne stories available for free, without subscription)
Creator's home page
Arcana Jayne article by The Pulse
Creator's Interview at Sequential Tart
Sequential Tart review (January 2004)

2000s webcomics
Fantasy webcomics